Hilarie Ros Burton (born July 1, 1982) is an American actress, businesswoman, author and producer. A former host of MTV's Total Request Live, she portrayed Peyton Sawyer on The WB/CW drama One Tree Hill for six seasons (2003–2009). Post One Tree Hill, Burton starred in Our Very Own, Solstice, and The List. She has also had supporting or recurring roles in television series, including her role as Sara Ellis on White Collar (2010–2013), Dr. Lauren Boswell on the ABC medical drama Grey's Anatomy (2013), Molly Dawes on the ABC drama series Forever (2014), and Karen Palmer on the Fox television series Lethal Weapon (2016).

Early life
Burton was born and raised in Sterling, Virginia. Her father is a veteran of the US Army, and her mother is a real estate agent. She is the eldest of four children with three brothers. She graduated from Park View High School in 2000, where she was student council treasurer her sophomore year, vice-president her junior year, and captain of the cheerleading squad, student council president, and homecoming queen her senior year.

Career

Media personality
Burton's first big break came when working as a VJ for MTV's Total Request Live (TRL). She was supposed to be a guest commentator for one segment, but producers decided to offer her a permanent job. Burton went on to present at the 2000 MTV Video Music Awards and MTV's Iced Out New Year's Eve. Burton went on to portray herself on The WB drama Dawson's Creek in 2002, which marked her television debut.

In October 2017, when news of the Harvey Weinstein sexual abuse cases broke, Burton retweeted a 2003 video clip from TRL Uncensored in which Ben Affleck squeezed her breast on air. This was in response to a fan tweet that quipped, "[Affleck] also grabbed Hilarie Burton-Morgan's breasts on TRL once. Everyone forgot though." Burton replied, "I didn't forget [about it] ... I was a kid." Affleck, who'd just publicly criticized Weinstein, subsequently responded on Twitter to apologize to Burton. When asked about the incident a month later on The Late Show with Stephen Colbert, Affleck said, "I don't remember it, but I absolutely apologize for it. I certainly don't think she's lying or making it up.'"

On May 5, 2020, Burton published her first non-fiction book The Rural Diaries: Love, Livestock, and Big Life Lessons Down on Mischief Farm.

In 2021, Burton started a podcast with One Tree Hill co-stars Sophia Bush and Bethany Joy Lenz titled Drama Queens.

Acting and producing
Burton was cast in The WB drama series One Tree Hill as Peyton Sawyer, an independent visual and musical artist and cheerleader, in April 2003. The series premiered on September 23, 2003, and went on to be the network's top rated program of the year. The role was considered Burton's breakout role and is her best known to date. For her role in the series, Burton was featured on the cover of Maxim, American Cheerleader Magazine and People. Her performance received critical praise and she earned three Teen Choice Award nominations. In May 2009, The CW announced Burton would not be returning for the show's seventh season based on her own decision not to return, contrary to rumors she left owing to salary issues.

One Tree Hill heightened Burton's public profile. In May 2007 she was ranked #77 in Maxims "Hot 100 List of 2007". She also appeared on the cover of the November 2006 edition of Maxim with One Tree Hill co-stars Sophia Bush and Danneel Harris. In previous years, Burton ranked #2 on Femme Fatales "The 50 Sexiest Women of 2005", and #12 on Much Music's "20 Hottest Women of 2003".

While still a One Tree Hill cast member, Burton made her feature film debut opposite Allison Janney and Cheryl Hines in the 2005 well-reviewed drama Our Very Own which centered on five small-town teenagers who dream of a better life. Burton and her co-stars received the "Outstanding Ensemble Acting" award at the prestigious Sarasota Film Festival. Burton appeared in the 2007 Lifetime drama Normal Adolescent Behavior which followed a group of friends who are in a six-way polyfidelitous relationship. That same year, Burton co-starred in the supernatural horror film Solstice opposite Amanda Seyfried and Elisabeth Harnois. Burton also created her own production company, Southern Gothic Production (SoGoPro) in 2007, along with Nick Gray, Kelly Tenney, James Burton, and Meg Mortimer.

In 2008, Burton appeared in both the Fox Searchlight Pictures drama The Secret Life of Bees, as the deceased mother of Dakota Fanning's character, and the limited release thriller The List. Burton was next cast in the film Bloodworth opposite Hilary Duff and Val Kilmer, an adaptation of the novel Provinces of Night by William Gay. The film premiered after her exit from One Tree Hill, at the 2010 Santa Barbara International Film Festival, but made little money in limited release. Burton won a recurring arc in the USA Network crime drama series White Collar in 2010 as Sara Ellis, an insurance investigator in the second season. She was upgraded to a series regular in 2011 for the third season, but switched back to the recurring cast in the fourth season. 2012 saw Burton guest-starring on the ABC police comedy-drama Castle (season 4, episode 13) as a reality television star who is accused of murder. Next came a recurring role in the ABC medical drama Grey's Anatomy for the final three episodes of the 2013 ninth season, as Dr. Lauren Boswell. That fall, Burton had a recurring role on the short-lived CBS drama Hostages. Burton reunited with One Tree Hill co-star Tyler Hilton for a recurring role on CBS sci-fi drama Extant in 2015. Burton appeared as the DEA agent love interest of main character Martin Riggs on Lethal Weapon from the seventh episode of the first season in 2016 through the third episode of the second season in 2017.

In November 2017, Burton spoke out in light of charges that One Tree Hill creator Mark Schwahn had sexually harassed some of the female crew, alleging that she had also been sexually harassed by Schwahn.

Burton guest-starred in the tenth season of The Walking Dead as Negan's wife Lucille, appearing alongside her real-life husband Jeffrey Dean Morgan who plays Negan.

Personal life

During her time on One Tree Hill, Burton resided in Wilmington, North Carolina, where the show was filmed.

In 2009, Burton began a relationship with actor Jeffrey Dean Morgan, after being introduced on a blind date set up by Jensen Ackles and his wife Danneel, their previous co-stars.

The couple's first child is a son; their second child is a daughter.

Burton has been candid on social media about their struggle to conceive, stating that it took five years to successfully carry a second baby to term. The couple married on October 5, 2019. Their private wedding was attended by many of their One Tree Hill and Supernatural  co-stars.

Morgan and Burton have made their home in Rhinebeck, New York, on a 100-acre working farm in the Hudson Valley with cows, ducks, chickens, alpacas, donkeys, and an emu.

Since 2014, they have been co-owners (along with Morgan's friend, actor Paul Rudd) of Samuel's Sweet Shop, a Rhinebeck candy store they saved from being closed after the previous owner, a friend of theirs, died suddenly.

Discography

Soundtracks
 The Road Mix: Music from the Television Series One Tree Hill, Volume 3 (2007)

Filmography

Film

Television

Music videos

Podcast

Awards and nominations

References

External links

 
 
 Hilarie Burton's page on CWTV.com 
 Hilarie Burton's SoGoPro Productions creating a stir – starnewsonline.com
 SoGoPro

American film actresses
American film producers
American infotainers
American soap opera actresses
American television actresses
American women television producers
Living people
Actresses from Virginia
People from Sterling, Virginia
VJs (media personalities)
Fordham University alumni
21st-century American actresses
New York University alumni
American women film producers
Television producers from Virginia
1982 births